In music, Op. 116 stands for Opus number 116. Compositions that are assigned this number include:

 Brahms – Fantasies, Op. 116
 Prokofiev – Ivan the Terrible
 Schumann – Der Königssohn (Uhland), for solos, chorus and orchestra